François Picolot (21 April 1889 – 15 September 1926) was a French racing cyclist. He rode in the 1923 Tour de France.

References

1889 births
1926 deaths
French male cyclists
Place of birth missing